Winifred Constance Leech (5 August 1920 – 10 May 2000) was an English cricketer who played as an all-rounder. She appeared in two Test matches for England in 1951, both against Australia. She played domestic cricket for Middlesex.

References

External links
 
 

1920 births
2000 deaths
People from Tooting
England women Test cricketers
Middlesex women cricketers